This is a list of law schools in Alabama, arranged in alphabetical order.

References

External links
American Bar Association, Alphabetical School List
U.S. News & World Report Ranking of Law Schools

 
Alabama